Şerif is a Turkish name. Notable people with the name include:

Given name
 Şerif Gören, Turkish film director
 Şerif Mardin, Turkish social scientist
 Şerif Pasha, Kurdish nationalist
 Şerif Muhiddin Targan, Turkish musician
 Şerif Turgut, Turkish woman war correspondent

Middle name
 Halil Şerif Pasha (1831–1879), Ottoman-Egyptian diplomat and art collector

Surname
 Aşık Mahzuni Şerif, Turkish folk musician

See also
 Sherif, given name and surname

Turkish-language surnames
Turkish masculine given names